New Jersey Manufacturers Insurance Company - Insurance Company 
New Jewel Movement - populist Marxist political movement in Grenada
New Justice Machine - comic trilogy
New Youth of Macau (Nova Juventude de Macau) - a political party in Macau